Kim Johannesen (born 18 July 1979) is a Danish handball player, currently playing for Danish Handball League side Viborg HK. He joined the club in 2006 from league rivals TMS Ringsted.

External links
 Player info

1979 births
Living people
Danish male handball players
Viborg HK players